is a Shinto shrine in the Tadadokoro neighborhood of the city of Kawanishi in Hyōgo Prefecture, Japan. The shrine is also called ‘Tada-Daigongen-Sha’ or ‘Kansai Nikko’, literally, ‘Nikko of Western Japan’. This shrine is the shrine of the Seiwa Genji clan from which Minamoto no Yoritomo and many subsequent Shogun and daimyō clans claimed descent. This shrine is one of Three Genji Shrines, with Rokusonnō Shrine in Kyoto and Tsuboi Hachimangū in Osaka. The shrine was designated a National Historic Site in 1951.

Enshrined kami
The kami enshrined at Tada Jinja are:
 , also known as

History
In 970, Settsu-no-kami Minamoto no Mitsunaka, the founder of the Seiwa Genji clan, received an oracle from Sumiyoshi Ōkami to established his residence in what is now Kawanishi. A temple (commonly known as Tada-in) was built, as Mitsunaka, converted to Buddhism following the visit of Ingen (954–1028), Genshin (942–1017), and Kaku'ub, of the Tendai sect.  The new convert declared, "You have shown me such extraordinary virtuous things. I'm someone who has killed an immeasurable number of living things.  I'd like to atone for these sins.  By building a Buddhist Hall I will stop committing any more crimes and save the lives of living things."  "What is known as Tada-in is a cluster of halls that began to be built with this one." When Mitsunaka died in 997 he was buried in Tada-in. In the Kamakura period, the temple was regarded as the ancestral mausoleum of Seiwa-Genji, but it gradually declined. In the middle of the Kamakura period, Hojo Yasutoki, the shikken of the Kamakura Shogunate, became the land steward of Tada-sho shōen, he decided to carry out a large-scale reconstruction of the Tada-in. In 1273, Ninsho of Saidai-ji was appointed to undertake the restoration, and as a result, the temple changed from the Tendai sect to the Shingon Risshu sect. In the Muromachi period, Ashikaga Takauji, who was a descendent of the Seiwa Genji, revered the Tada-in, and temple became a mortuary temple for the Ashikaga shogunate, with the ashes of successive generations of shogun buried at the temple. However, the temple was destroyed by the forces of Oda Nobunaga in 1577. It remained in ruins until restored in 1665 by Sakakibara Tadatsugu of Himeji Domain, Inaba Masanori of Odawara Domain and the descendants of the Tada-in retainers. Shogun Tokugawa Ietsuna granted an estate with a kokudaka of 500 koku for its upkeep, and most of its structures were rebuilt by 1667. As with the Ashikaga, successive generation of the Tokugawa shoguns ashes and ihai mortuary tablets with enshrined at the temple. Shogun Tokugawa Tsunayoshi restored the main shrine building in 1695. 

In the Meiji period, due to the separation of Shintoism and Buddhism by the government, Tada-in was transformed into a Shinto shrine enshrining Minamoto no Mitsunaka, Minamoto no Yorimitsu, Minamoto no Yorinobu, Minamoto no Yoriyoshi, and Minamoto no Yoshiie as kami. The shrine was ranked as a Prefectural Shrine under the Modern system of ranked Shinto Shrines

Gallery

Cultural Properties

Important Cultural Properties
, built in 1667
, built in 1667
, built in 1667
, 43 scrolls with 492 document

National Tangible Cultural Properties
, built in 1667

See also
List of Shinto shrines
List of Historic Sites of Japan (Hyōgo)

References

External links

 
Hyogo Tourism home page
Kawanishi City official website

Shinto shrines in Hyōgo Prefecture
Settsu Province
Kawanishi, Hyōgo
Important Cultural Properties of Japan
Historic Sites of Japan
Minamoto clan
Beppyo shrines